Terrell Myers (born August 28, 1974 in New Haven, Connecticut) is an American professional basketball player.

Terrell attended James Hillhouse after graduation then attended St. Thomas More Prep school in Waterbury, Connecticut, followed by Saint Joseph's University, Philadelphia, where he studied and played basketball from 1993 to 1997. After graduating, Myers moved to England, signing professionally for the British Basketball League team Sheffield Sharks, where he had four seasons, winning the BBL Trophy in 1998, the League Championship in 1999 and the BBL Cup in 2000. He won awards for the BBL Player of the Year 1998-99 (when he averaged 23.5 PPG) and the BBL Cup MVP in 1999, and was named in the All-Star team for four seasons running (1998–2002).

In 2001, Terrell moved to the London Towers and, in 2003, to the Spanish lower-league team Casademont Girona. After two seasons, Myers moved to the Asociación de Clubs de Baloncesto to play for Akasvayu Girona in one of Europe's biggest leagues, after which he moved to CB Murcia.

Myers is now the head basketball coach at St Andrew's School in Delaware.

References

External links
British Basketball League stats

1974 births
Living people
American expatriate basketball people in Spain
Basketball players from Connecticut
British men's basketball players
CB Girona players
CB Murcia players
Liga ACB players
London Towers players
Saint Joseph's Hawks men's basketball players
Sheffield Sharks players
American men's basketball players